KOGA (930 AM) is a radio station broadcasting a classic country format that is licensed to Ogallala, Nebraska, United States. It is owned by iHeartMedia and features programming from ABC Radio  and Westwood One.

Awards
The station was a finalist for the 2008 Crystal Radio Award for public service awarded by the National Association of Broadcasters.

Construction permit
On September 28, 2012 KOGA was granted a U.S. Federal Communications Commission construction permit to decrease day power to 2,100 watts and change to using a nondirectional antenna during the day.

Change to Classic Country
In January 2019 KOGA changed their format from adult standards to classic country.

References

External links

FCC construction permit

OGA
Classic country radio stations in the United States
Radio stations established in 1976
1976 establishments in Nebraska
IHeartMedia radio stations